Conus cazalisoi is a species of sea snail, a marine gastropod mollusc in the family Conidae, the cone snails, cone shells or cones.

This snail is predatory and venomous and is capable of "stinging" humans.

Description

Distribution
This marine species of cone snail occurs off the Cape Verdes.

References

 Cossignani T. & Fiadeiro R. (2018). Quattro nuovi coni da Capo Verde. Malacologia Mostra Mondiale. 98: 14-20.

cazalisoi
Gastropods described in 2018
Gastropods of Cape Verde